Dillwyn is an incorporated town in Buckingham County, Virginia, in the United States. The population was 447 at the 2010 census.

History
The Peter Francisco House was listed on the National Register of Historic Places in 1972. 
It is located approximately 9 miles east/southeast of the Town of Dillwyn.

Geography
Dillwyn is located in east-central Buckingham County at  (37.541658, −78.458869).

Demographics

At the 2010 census there were 447 people, 176 households, and 114 families living in the town. The population density was 646.4 people per square mile (250.1/km). There were 200 housing units at an average density of 289.2 per square mile (111.9/km). The racial makeup of the town was 57.27% White, 39.60% African American, 0.67% from other races, and 2.46% from two or more races. Hispanic or Latino of any race were 0.67%.

Of the 176 households 30.7% had children under the age of 18 living with them, 38.6% were married couples living together, 22.2% had a female householder with no husband present, and 34.7% were non-families. 32.4% of households were one person and 19.9% were one person aged 65 or older. The average household size was 2.16 and the average family size was 2.63.

The age distribution was 20.6% under the age of 18, 4.3% from 18 to 24, 21.5% from 25 to 44, 24.2% from 45 to 64, and 29.5% 65 or older. The median age was 48 years. For every 100 females, there were 70.6 males. For every 100 females age 18 and over, there were 68.2 males.

The median household income was $19,167 and the median family income  was $24,688. Males had a median income of $19,167 versus $17,868 for females. The per capita income for the town was $11,091. About 29.7% of families and 34.9% of the population were below the poverty line, including 59.2% of those under age 18 and 29.7% of those age 65 or over.

In popular culture
In AMC's drama series Breaking Bad, Dillwyn is named as the false hideout location of Jesse Pinkman, who is running for his life from Gus Fring.

References

External links
Town website

Towns in Buckingham County, Virginia
Towns in Virginia